The Lo Nuestro Award for Regional Mexican Song of the Year is an honor presented annually by American television network Univision at the Lo Nuestro Awards. The accolade was established to recognize the most talented performers of Latin music. The nominees and winners were originally selected by a voting poll conducted among program directors of Spanish-language radio stations in the United States and also based on chart performance on Billboard Latin music charts, with the results being tabulated and certified by the accounting firm Deloitte. However, since 2004, the winners are selected through an online survey. The trophy awarded is shaped in the form of a treble clef.

The award was first presented to "Y Ahora Te Vas" by Mexican band Los Bukis. Mexican performer Gerardo Ortíz holds the record for the most awards, winning on three occasions. Fellow Mexican band Los Yonics is the most nominated act without a win, with four unsuccessful nominations.

Winners and nominees
Listed below are the winners of the award for each year, as well as the other nominees for the majority of the years awarded.

See also
 Latin Grammy Award for Best Regional Song

References

Regional Mexican Song of the Year
Regional Mexican songs
Song awards
Awards established in 1989